József Csikány (born 26 April 1943) is a retired Hungarian backststroke swimmer who won two bronze medals at the European championships of 1962 and 1966. He competed in backstroke and medley relay events at the 1960 and 1964 Summer Olympics; his best achievement was sixth place in the 4 × 100 m medley relay in 1964.

References

1943 births
Living people
Swimmers at the 1960 Summer Olympics
Swimmers at the 1964 Summer Olympics
Olympic swimmers of Hungary
Hungarian male swimmers
European Aquatics Championships medalists in swimming
Male backstroke swimmers
Universiade medalists in swimming
Universiade gold medalists for Hungary
Medalists at the 1963 Summer Universiade
Swimmers from Budapest